RWD was a Polish aircraft construction bureau active between 1928 and 1939. It started as a team of three young designers, Stanisław Rogalski, Stanisław Wigura and Jerzy Drzewiecki, whose names formed the RWD acronym.

History

They started work while studying at Warsaw University of Technology. In December 1925, with some other student constructors, they set up workshops at the Aviation Section of Mechanics Students' Club (Sekcja Lotnicza Koła Mechaników Studentów), where they manufactured their first designs. From 1926 they designed several aircraft alone (Drzewiecki JD-2 and WR-1), in 1928 they joined forces as one team, starting with RWD-1 sportsplane. Apart from building planes, J. Drzewiecki was a test pilot of their designs, while S. Wigura flew as a mechanic in competitions. In 1930 the team was moved to new workshops at Okęcie district in Warsaw, near the Okęcie aerodrome, today's Warsaw International Airport, founded by the LOPP paramilitary organization. On 11 September 1932, Stanisław Wigura died in an air crash in the RWD-6 during a storm, but the RWD name continued to be used for new designs (according to a popular story, the letter W now de facto stood for engineer Jerzy Wędrychowski, but he was not a designer). In 1933, Rogalski, Drzewiecki and Wędrychowski founded the company Doświadczalne Warsztaty Lotnicze (DWL, Experimental Aeronautical Works) in Warsaw, which became a manufacturer of further RWD aircraft. Apart from Rogalski and Drzewiecki,the construction bureau employed designers Tadeusz Chyliński, Bronisław Żurakowski, Leszek Dulęba and Andrzej Anczutin and several engineers, including Henryk Millicer.

At first, the RWD team designed and built light sport planes. Early designs RWD-2 and RWD-4 were built in small series and used in Polish sports aviation, including their debut at the Challenge 1930 international contest. Their next designs performed particularly well in competitions - the RWD-6 won the Challenge 1932 and RWD-9s won the Challenge 1934 international contest. The RWD-5 sport plane was the lightest plane to fly across the Atlantic in 1933. Three types saw mass production: the RWD-8, which became the Polish Air Force's basic trainer, the RWD-13 touring plane and the RWD-14 Czapla reconnaissance plane (1938).

Other important designs were the RWD-10 aerobatic plane (1933), RWD-17 aerobatic-trainer plane (1937) and RWD-21 light sport plane (1939). World War II prevented further development and serial production of later RWD designs, and put an end to the RWD construction bureau and the DWL production plant.

Aircraft

References

Footnotes

Notes

Bibliography

 Glass, Andrzej: "Polskie konstrukcje lotnicze 1893-1939" (Polish Aviation Designs 1893-1939), WKiŁ, Warsaw 1977 
 Glass, Andrzej: "Slownik biograficzny technikow polskich" (The Biographical Dictionary of Polish Engineers), SBTP, Warsaw 2003

External links

 RWD aeroplanes
 History of RWD and DWL works (Polish and French)
 RWD-6 Replica Project

Aircraft manufacturers of Poland
Science and technology in Poland
Polish brands